Lebang Boomani dance (also Lebang Bumani) is a harvest dance performed by the Tripuri people of Tripura, India. It is one of two dances associated with the Tripuris, the other being the Garia dance that is performed at the time of sowing crops.

Tripuri dances 
Tripuris comprise half the tribal population of Tripura. They live in the hills of Tripura and are jhum cultivators. Their dances and festivals revolve around the agricultural seasons.

Garia dance 
The Tripuris practice jhum or shifting cultivation and the Garia festival marks the commencement of their sowing season. Garia is commemorated through the Garia dance that accompanies the prayers and pujas for a bountiful harvest and is held in April.

Lebangs 
Following Garia, there is a lull in agricultural activity as the Tripuris await the monsoon. During this time hordes of colorful insects called lebangs descend on the hill slopes in search of the sown seeds. The dancers depict how bamboo clappers are used to catch them. The Tripuris believe that the number of lebangs caught indicate how good the harvest will be.

Lebang Boomani 
Both men and women participate in the Lebang Boomani dance. The men use bamboo clappers called tokkas to set a beat while the women join them waving colorful scarves to catch the lebang. The rhythmic play of the clappers is thought to attract the lebang out of their hiding places allowing the women to catch them. The dance is accompanied by musical instruments like the flute, khamb, the percussion instrument pung and the sarinda. Women adorn themselves with silver chains and bangles and ear and nose rings made of bronze.

External links 
 Lebang Boomani dance on YouTube

References 

Dances of Tripura